is a Japanese long-distance runner who specializes in the marathon race.

She won the silver medal at the 1999 World Championships in Seville in a personal best time of 2:27:02 hours. She finished 15th at the 2000 Summer Olympics.

Achievements
All results regarding marathon, unless stated otherwise

Personal bests
5000 metres - 15:57.93 min (2000)
10,000 metres -  32:17.71 min (1998)
Half marathon - 1:09:23 hrs (1997)
Marathon - 2:27:02 hrs (1999)

External links
 
 
 

1977 births
Living people
Japanese female long-distance runners
Japanese female marathon runners
Athletes (track and field) at the 2000 Summer Olympics
Olympic athletes of Japan
Olympic female marathon runners
People from Tokushima Prefecture
World Athletics Championships medalists
20th-century Japanese women
21st-century Japanese women